Snježana Martinović (born 11 June 1967) is an actress who has appeared in Bosnian-Herzegovinan, Croatian, French, German, Italian and Slovenian films and theatre productions.

Film

Theatre

[a] guest performance in the Novi Sad Festival
[b] examination performance, presented by the Sarajevo Academy of Performing Arts at an international meeting of the Performing Arts Academies of Poland, Slovenia, Croatia and Bosnia-Herzegovina, on the topic of stage composition
[c] guest performances in cities including Lyon, Paris, Skopje, and Toulouse
[d] direction mentor: A. Glamočak
[e] direction mentor: Mladen Materić

[f] the play selected for Grenoble's 12th Festival of Theatre Europeen 1996 
[g] choreography by Ursula Bischoff
[h] play by Nobel laureate Elfriede Jelinek, based on the life of Jackie Kennedy
[i] Martinović won an award for this performance (see below)

Martinović has also been involved in theatre productions at Associazione Juliet, Muggia, and at Open Stage Obala, Sarajevo.

Other work
As of April 2015, Martinović was teaching film and theatre courses at United World College in Mostar, Bosnia and Herzegovina. She has previously taught at Mostarskoj Dramskoj Akademiji (Drama Academy of Mostar).

Awards
 2010 Award for the best actress in BiH (character Olga, Njegove tri sestre, director Scott Fielding) during the Kazališne igre festival in Jajce.
 2007 Award for the best film (Belle epoque, director Nikola Stojanović, character Jovanka) at a festival in Novi Sad, Serbia
 2007 Award Mravac for the best actress (character Jackie, director Snježana Martinović — independent project) on festival author poetics in Mostar, BiH

References

External links

1967 births
20th-century Bosnia and Herzegovina actresses
21st-century Bosnia and Herzegovina actresses
Bosnia and Herzegovina film actresses
Bosnia and Herzegovina stage actresses
Living people
Actors from Mostar